The 1996–97 FIS Ski Jumping World Cup was the 18th World Cup season in ski jumping and the 7th official World Cup season in ski flying. It began in Lillehammer, Norway on 30 November 1996 and finished in Planica, Slovenia on 23 March 1997. The individual World Cup was won by Primož Peterka and Nations Cup by Japan.

Lower competitive circuits this season included the Grand Prix and Continental Cup.

Map of world cup hosts 
All 17 locations which have been hosting world cup events for men this season.

 Four Hills Tournament
 Nordic Tournament

Calendar

Men

Men's team

Standings

Overall

Ski Jumping (JP) Cup

Ski Flying

Nations Cup

Four Hills Tournament

Nordic Tournament

References 

World cup
World cup
FIS Ski Jumping World Cup